EsTram (Eskişehir Tramvay) is a tram system in Eskişehir, Turkey. Construction began in August 2002 and it became operational in December 2004. Rolling stock is Bombardier Flexity Outlook low-floor articulated light-rail trams.

It is owned by Eskişehir Metropolitan Municipality - EsTram Light Rail Transport Company 

In 2014, the network expanded with four extensions. The service now has seven routes. The newly added lines were Emek-71 Evler, Batıkent-SSK (ring), Çamlıca-SSK (ring) and Çankaya-Osmangazi University (ring). The Emek-71 Evler line was itself extended in 2019 to reach the City hospital.

References

External links 

 http://www2.estram.com.tr/Anasayfa

Transport in Eskişehir Province
Tram transport in Turkey
Metre gauge railways in Turkey